Veale Gardens is part of the Adelaide Parklands throughout and surrounding the City of Adelaide.  It is located in the South Parklands surrounded by Greenhill and Peacock Roads, South Terrace, and Sir Lewis Cohen Avenue.  The gardens can be entered by entrances on South Terrace.

Veale Gardens is named after William Charles Douglas Veale, who was Adelaide's Town Clerk from January 1947 to November 1965, and close friend of mayor A. C. Rymill.

Features
Featuring a garden of roses with over 50 varieties of rose on display, the gardens include two rose beds containing the City of Adelaide rose, located at the South Terrace entrance, and Queen Adelaide rose, located at the corner of South Terrace and Sir Lewis Cohen Avenue.  There are many walks through the parks taking you through gardens of water features, past the greenhouse, and through more lush shady areas.  The gardens are also home to the Adelaide Pavilion restaurant and function centre, and is a popular location for weddings and wedding photography shoots.

Meeting place
For many years, a section of Veale Gardens was known as a "homosexual meeting place". There had been much debate over the years about whether to police Veale Gardens more closely due both to public complaint about loitering and lewd behaviour, or to provide more availability of security as a deterrent against violence and murder of vulnerable gay men (or any other soft target) who may have been visiting the park; at the hands of homophobic or otherwise abusive and violent people.

In the absence of policies which were able to embrace public expressions of sexuality and create greater safety and support for the socially isolated, in late 2006 the public toilets were bulldozed and new toilets built on the South Terrace frontage. In 2007, the park entrance off Sir Lewis Cohen Avenue was closed and the street returned to park land to reduce late night parking.

In more recent times the area of Veale Gardens and adjacent parkland has again become controversial because it has provided a relatively safe haven for Aboriginal people from distant inland communities who may be visiting Adelaide for periods of time and who would prefer to be staying informally outside rather than in formal suburban housing; if indeed  these formal accommodations are available to them.

References

Parks in Adelaide
South Terrace, Adelaide